Zenon Park is a village in the Canadian province of Saskatchewan within the Rural Municipality of Arborfield No. 456 and Census Division No. 14. Zenon Park is bilingual, using English and French.

History 
In 1910, French-American settlers arrived; later came immigrants from Quebec and Northern United States. In 1913, Zenon Park was officially named after Zenon Chamberland, the postmaster. The economy then depended on agriculture, including alfalfa farming and lumber. Zenon Park incorporated as a village on July 28, 1941.

Heritage properties
The community has one designated heritage property, the Paroisse Notre Dame de la Nativité (Our Lady of the Nativity Roman Catholic Church) (previously called the Eglise Notre Dame de la Nativité) was constructed in between 1930 - 1931 by Filion & Sons Co.

Demographics 

Transportation 
Zenon Park is on the Thunder Rail short-line railway.

Media 
 CKZP-FM - Community Radio Station Operating in Zenon Park

See also 
 List of communities in Saskatchewan
 Villages of Saskatchewan

References

External links

Villages in Saskatchewan
Arborfield No. 456, Saskatchewan
Division No. 14, Saskatchewan